Pulhal is a Northwestern residential town in Chennai district in the Indian state of Tamil Nadu. Pulhal is located on the banks of Pulhal Lake. The town is known for Pulhal Central Prison.

The area is one of the 163 notified areas (megalithic sites) in the state of Tamil Nadu.

History 
In ancient times, the region was ruled by a chief of the Kurumbars variously titled as Kamunda Kurumba Prabhu and Pulhal Raja who is also credited with building a royal fort at this site. The fort and the land was later overran by the Chola sovereign from Thanjavur.

Geography

Pulhal Lake
Pulhal aeri, or Pulhal lake, also known as the Red Hills Lake, is located in Ponneri Taluk of Thiruvallur district, Tamil Nadu, India. It is one of the two rain-fed reservoirs from where water is drawn for supply to Chennai City, the other one being the Chembarambakkam Lake / Porur Lake.

Demographics
 India census, Pulhal had a population of 20,297. Males constitute 49% of the population and females 51%. Pulhal has an average literacy rate of 76%, higher than the national average of 59.5%; male literacy is 84%, and female literacy is 68%. In Pulhal, 14% of the population is under 6 years of age. Pulhal is now in Chennai District. Major to supply water to Chennai people.

Pulhal Camp or Srilankan Refugee camp 
Pulhal camp is one of the Sri Lankan refugee camps out of 115 camps were found in Tamil Nadu. According to Indian census Thiruvallur districts has second highest Sri Lankan refugee population. It has 1,646 households with a total of 5,387 refugees. Particularly Pulhal camp has second highest refugee population in Thiruvallur district. It accounts for 408 households with a refugee population of 1,283. That is why Pulhal Town is also expressed as Camp.

Amenities
 Urban community health center

Pulhal Central Prison
Pulhal Central Prison is located in the neighbourhood. The prison began operation in 2006, replacing the erstwhile Chennai Central Prison.

The plan for the construction of Pulhal Central Prison was conceived during the early 2000s. Sites in Pulhal and in Maraimalai Nagar were initially considered and the final decision to construct in Pulhal was made due to the availability of large piece of Government owned land. It was constructed by Tamil Nadu Police Housing Corporation (TNPHC) for a cost of  1,770 million in less than 3 years. It was inaugurated by then chief minister of Tamil Nadu, M. Karunanidhi, on 26 November 2006.

Education
 Jain Vidyaashram
 Velammal Global School
 Narayana E-tech
 Dr. Sivanthi Aditanar Matriculation Higher Secondary School 
 Greenfield International School

References

External links

Cities and towns in Tiruvallur district
Neighbourhoods in Chennai
Suburbs of Chennai